Bunz may refer to:

 Dan Bunz (born 1955), American football player
 Mercedes Bunz (born 1971), German art historian, philosopher, and journalist
 Bunz Trading Zone Toronto online community and company

See also
 Budz
 Cunz